Aleksey Mikhailovich Yemelin (born October 16, 1968) is a retired high jumper  who represented the USSR and later Russia.

Major achievements

References

1968 births
Living people
Athletes from Moscow
Soviet male high jumpers
Russian male high jumpers
World Athletics Championships athletes for Russia
European Athletics Championships medalists
Russian Athletics Championships winners